Leonard Joseph Madden (July 2, 1890 – September 9, 1949) was an American baseball player who played pitcher in the Major Leagues in 1912.  He played for the Chicago Cubs.

References

1890 births
1949 deaths
Major League Baseball pitchers
Chicago Cubs players
Aurora Blues players
South Bend Benders players
Terre Haute Terre-iers players
Terre Haute Highlanders players
Baseball players from Ohio